Kawakami may refer to:

People 
 Kawakami (surname)

Places 
 Kawakami District, Hokkaidō, a district in Hokkaidō
 In Okayama Prefecture,
 Kawakami, Okayama (Kawakami) was a town in the former Kawakami District
 Kawakami, Okayama (Maniwa) was a village in Maniwa District
 Kawakami, Nagano, a village in Nagano Prefecture
 Kawakami, Nara, a village in Nara Prefecture
 Kawaue, Gifu, a former village in Gifu Prefecture that is now part of the city of Nakatsugawa, Gifu, was written the same way as Kawakami (川上村).

Other uses 
 an Hydrangea aspera variety